Johann Wilhelm Albrecht Sudholz (17 May 1821 – 7 November 1903) was an Australian politician. He was a member of the South Australian House of Assembly from February to May 1875, representing the electorate of Murray.

Sudholz was born at Kirchdorf in Hanover, and arrived at Port Adelaide in 1846 on the Heerjheebhoy Rustomjee Patel. He settled at Gilles Plains, where he became a successful farmer. He was one of the founders of the Bethlehem Lutheran Church in Flinders Street, Adelaide, was a member of the Church Council of the Australian Synod for many years, and was described upon his death as one of the "most prominent and whole-hearted members" of the Lutheran Church in Australia.

Sudholz was elected to the House of Assembly at the 1875 election, but was unseated by the Committee of Disputed Returns and disqualified from that term of parliament on 22 May for bribery and corruption when it was found that his agents had run up a bill at the Angaston Hotel contrary to electoral law. He denied responsibility and stated that he had only paid the bill to avoid scandal, but the committee unanimously found against him. The decision was the subject of considerable local protest.

He later contested the 1893 election in the seat of Yatala, but was unsuccessful. He died in 1903 and was buried at Walkerville Cemetery.

References

Members of the South Australian House of Assembly
1821 births
1903 deaths
19th-century Australian politicians